Ovidiu Creangă (February 14, 1921 – December 4, 2017) was a Romanian activist and author. He served as an official of the Ministry of Economy (Romania) and taught at the Politehnica University of Bucharest. He lived in Canada from 1982 until his death in late 2017.

Biography
Ovidiu Creangă was born on February 14, 1921, in Vărzăreşti, present-day Moldova. He attended high school in Bălţi, where Eugen Coşeriu, Sergiu Grossu, Valeriu Gafencu, Vadim Pirogan, Valentin Mândâcanu were his classmates After Soviet occupation of 1940, he fled from Bessarabia and in 1944 from Cernăuţi, where he attended university. Then he graduated from the Politehnica University of Bucharest. Also, he taught at the Politehnica University of Bucharest. In the 1970s, Ovidiu Creangă was an official of the Ministry of Economy (Romania). In 1982, when he was 61, Ovidiu Creangă emigrated to Canada. He died in December 2017 at the age of 96.

Awards 
 Order of Work,Romania
 Medal of Work,Romania
 "Magna Cum Laude", Politehnica University of Bucharest

Works
 Ovidiu Creangă, "Cu şi fără securişti", Preface Paul Goma, (Vicovia, Bacău, 2009)

Notes

References

External links 
 Cum am scăpat de Siberia
 Scriitorul Ovidiu Creangă: "N-aş vrea să mor înainte de a vedea Basarabia alipită la Patria Mamă – România!"
 Ovidiu Creangă Basarabeanul- un blog de atitudine în căutarea Adevărului
 Ovidiu Creanga
 Autor: Ovidiu Creanga

1921 births
2017 deaths
Eastern Orthodox Christians from Romania
People from Nisporeni District
Politehnica University of Bucharest alumni
Romanian activists
Romanian emigrants to Canada
Romanian engineers
Romanian refugees